The Portland Trail Blazers are an American professional basketball team based in Portland, Oregon. They play in the Northwest Division of the Western Conference of the National Basketball Association (NBA). The franchise was founded in the 1970–71 NBA season.

The Trail Blazers first participated in the NBA Draft on March 23, 1970, before their inaugural NBA season.  Before each draft, an NBA draft lottery determines the first round selection order for the teams that missed the playoffs during the prior season. Teams can also trade their picks, which means that teams may have more or less than two picks in some drafts, although they must have at least one first-round pick every other year.

The first pick in the Trail Blazers' history was Geoff Petrie, a guard from Princeton University.

Key

Selections

Footnotes
 On March 23, 1971, the Portland Trail Blazers acquired 1971 and 1972 second-round picks and a 1971 third-round pick from the San Francisco Warriors in exchange for Jim Barnett. The Blazers used the picks to draft Charlie Yelverton and William Smith.
 On October 22, 1970, the Portland Trail Blazers acquired a second-round pick from the Baltimore Bullets in exchange for Dorie Murrey. The Blazers used the pick to draft Rick Fisher.
 On March 23, 1971, the Portland Trail Blazers acquired 1971 and 1972 second-round picks and a 1971 third-round pick from the Golden State Warriors (as the San Francisco Warriors) in exchange for Jim Barnett. The Blazers used the pick to draft Dave Twardzik.
 On September 11, 1971, the Portland Trail Blazers acquired a second-round pick from the Los Angeles Lakers in exchange for LeRoy Ellis. The Blazers used the pick to draft Ollie Johnson.
 On the draft-day, the Cleveland Cavaliers acquired a first-round pick and a third-round pick from the Portland Trail Blazers in exchange for John Johnson, Rick Roberson and Los Angeles Lakers' first-round pick. The Cavaliers used the picks to draft Jim Brewer and Jim O'Brien. The Blazers used the pick to draft Barry Parkhill.
 On October 14, 1973, the Portland Trail Blazers acquired a second-round pick from the Chicago Bulls in exchange for Rick Adelman. The Blazers used the pick to draft Phil Lumpkin.
 On September 11, 1972, the Portland Trail Blazers acquired a second-round pick from the Philadelphia 76ers as compensation for the signing of Gary Gregor as a free agent. Previously, the 76ers acquired the pick and future consideration (the 76ers acquired John Block on July 28, 1972) on December 13, 1971, from the Milwaukee Bucks in exchange for Wali Jones. The Blazers used the pick to draft Rubin Collins.
 On September 18, 1974, the Portland Trail Blazers acquired a third-round pick from the Chicago Bulls in exchange for Mickey Johnson. The Blazers used the pick to draft Gus Gerard.
 On September 16, 1974, the Portland Trail Blazers acquired Barry Clemens and future consideration (the Blazers acquired a second-round pick on May 25, 1976) from the New Orleans Jazz in exchange for Rick Roberson. Previously, the Jazz acquired Ron Behagen and the pick on May 28, 1975, from the Kansas City Kings in exchange for a 1975 first-round pick. The Blazers used the pick to draft Major Jones.
 On June 3, 1976, the Portland Trail Blazers acquired a 1977 second-round pick from the New Orleans Jazz in exchange for a 1976 second-round pick. The Blazers used the pick to draft Kim Anderson.
 On June 8, 1978, the Portland Trail Blazers acquired the first pick from the Indiana Pacers in exchange for Johnny Davis and the third pick. Previously, the Blazers acquired a first-round pick on October 18, 1976, from the Buffalo Braves in exchange for Moses Malone. The Blazers used the pick to draft Mychal Thompson.
 On November 11, 1977, the Portland Trail Blazers acquired a 1978 first-round pick and a 1979 second-round pick from the Seattle SuperSonics in exchange for Wally Walker. Previously, the Sonics acquired the pick on September 25, 1975, from the Detroit Pistons in exchange for Archie Clark. The Blazers used the pick to draft Ron Brewer.
 The Portland Trail Blazers acquired the draft rights to fourth pick Kelvin Ransey and a 1981 first-round pick from the Chicago Bulls in exchange for the draft rights to tenth pick Ronnie Lester and a 1981 first-round pick.
 On June 8, 1981, the Atlanta Hawks acquired a 1981 first-round pick and a 1981 second-round pick from the Chicago Bulls in exchange for a 1981 first-round pick, a 1982 second-round pick and an option to swap 1982 first-round draft picks. Previously, the Bulls acquired the draft rights to Ronnie Lester and the first-round pick on June 10, 1980, from the Portland Trail Blazers in exchange for the draft rights to Kelvin Ransey and a 1981 first-round pick. Previously, the Blazers acquired the pick on February 8, 1980, from the Philadelphia 76ers in exchange for Lionel Hollins. Previously, the 76ers acquired the pick and a 1983 first-round pick on October 3, 1977, from the Cleveland Cavaliers in exchange for Terry Furlow. The Hawks used the picks to draft Al Wood and Clyde Bradshaw. The Bulls used the pick to draft Orlando Woolridge. The Blazers used the pick to draft Darnell Valentine.
 On October 9, 1979, the Portland Trail Blazers acquired a second-round pick from the Indiana Pacers in exchange for Clemon Johnson. Previously, the Pacers acquired Bob Carrington, 1980 and 1981 second-round picks on January 27, 1978, from the New Jersey Nets in exchange for John Williamson. The Blazers used the pick to draft Brian Jackson.
 On June 5, 1981, Portland acquired a first-round pick from Indiana in exchange for Tom Owens. Portland used the pick to draft Sam Bowie.
 On August 18, 1983, Portland acquired a second-round pick from Indiana in exchange for Granville Waiters. Previously, Indiana acquired the draft rights to Sidney Lowe and the pick on June 28, 1983, from Chicago in exchange for the draft rights to Mitchell Wiggins. Portland used the pick to draft Victor Fleming.
 On August 15, 1980, Portland acquired a second-round pick and a 1983 first-round pick from Denver in exchange for T. R. Dunn and a 1983 first-round pick. Portland used the pick to draft Steve Colter.
 On October 8, 1980, Portland acquired a second-round pick from the L.A. Lakers in exchange for Jim Brewer. Portland used the pick to draft Jerome Kersey.
 Portland acquired the draft rights to 22nd pick Jarrett Jack from Denver in exchange for the draft rights to 27th pick Linas Kleiza and the draft rights to 35th pick Ricky Sánchez.
 Hours before the start of the draft, Utah acquired the 3rd pick from Portland in exchange for the 6th pick, the 27th pick and a 2006 first-round draft pick. Previously, Utah acquired a 2005 first-round draft pick on June 24, 2004, from Dallas in exchange for the draft rights to Pavel Podkolzin. Utah used the 3rd pick to draft Deron Williams and Portland used the 6th and the 27th pick to draft Martell Webster and Linas Kleiza.
 Portland acquired the draft rights to 2nd pick LaMarcus Aldridge a 2007 second-round draft pick from Chicago in exchange for the draft rights to 4th pick Tyrus Thomas and Viktor Khryapa.
 On June 28, 2005, Portland acquired Detroit's 2006 first-round draft pick, the 6th and 27th pick in 2005 from Utah in exchange for the 3rd pick in 2005. Previously, Utah acquired a 2006 first-round draft pick and Elden Campbell on January 21, 2005, from Detroit in exchange for Carlos Arroyo. Portland used the 30th pick to draft Joel Freeland.
 Memphis acquired the draft rights to 45th pick Alexander Johnson from Portland in exchange for a 2008 second-round draft pick. Previously, Portland acquired the draft rights to 45th pick Alexander Johnson, 2007 and 2008 second-round draft picks from Indiana in exchange for the draft rights to 31st pick James White.
 On June 28, 2006, Portland acquired 2007 and 2008 second-round draft picks and the draft rights to Alexander Johnson from Indiana in exchange for the draft rights to James White. Portland used the 42nd pick to draft Derrick Byars.
 Portland acquired the draft rights to 30th pick Petteri Koponen from Philadelphia in exchange for the draft rights to 42nd pick Derrick Byars and cash considerations.
 On October 10, 1997, Portland acquired a 2007 second-round draft pick from Toronto in a three-team trade with Toronto and New York. Portland used the 52nd pick to draft Taurean Green.
 On June 28, 2006, Portland acquired a 2007 second-round draft pick and the draft rights to LaMarcus Aldridge from Chicago in exchange for the draft rights to Tyrus Thomas and Viktor Khryapa. Portland used the 53rd pick to draft Demetris Nichols.
 New York acquired Zach Randolph, Dan Dickau, Fred Jones and the draft rights to 53rd pick Demetris Nichols from Portland in exchange for Steve Francis, Channing Frye and a 2008 second-round draft pick.
 Portland acquired the draft rights to 11th pick Jerryd Bayless and Ike Diogu from Indiana in exchange for the draft rights to 13th pick Brandon Rush, Jarrett Jack and Josh McRoberts. The trade was finalized on July 9, 2008.
 On June 28, 2006, Portland acquired a 2008 second-round draft pick from Memphis in exchange for the draft rights to Alexander Johnson. Portland used the pick to draft Joey Dorsey.
 In a three-team trade, Portland acquired the draft rights to 25th pick Nicolas Batum from Houston, Houston acquired the draft rights to 33rd pick Joey Dorsey from Portland and the draft rights to 28th pick Donté Greene and a 2009 second-round draft pick from Memphis, and Memphis acquired the draft rights to 27th pick Darrell Arthur from Portland.
 On June 28, 2007, Portland acquired a 2008 second-round draft pick, Steve Francis and Channing Frye from New York in exchange for Zach Randolph, Dan Dickau, Fred Jones and the draft rights to Demetris Nichols. Portland used the pick to draft Ömer Aşık.
 In a three-team trade, Chicago acquired the draft rights to 36th pick Ömer Aşık from Portland, the Trail Blazers acquired a second-round draft pick in 2009 from Denver and two future second-round draft picks from Chicago, and Denver acquired the draft rights to 39th pick Sonny Weems from Chicago.
 On June 28, 2006, Portland acquired Indiana's 2007 and Phoenix's 2008 second-round draft picks and the draft rights to Alexander Johnson from Indiana in exchange for the draft rights to James White. Previously, Indiana acquired a 2008 second-round draft pick on August 25, 2005, from Phoenix in exchange for James Jones. Portland used the pick to draft Mike Taylor.
 The L.A. Clippers acquired the draft rights to 55th pick Mike Taylor from Portland in exchange for a 2009 second-round draft pick.
 On June 24, 2009, Portland acquired the 22nd pick from Dallas in exchange for the 24th pick, 56th pick and a 2010 second-round draft pick. Portland used the 22nd pick to draft Víctor Claver and Dallas used the 24th and 56th pick to draft Byron Mullens and Ahmad Nivins respectively.
 On June 26, 2008, Portland acquired a 2009 second-round draft pick from the L.A. Clippers in exchange for the draft rights to Mike Taylor. Portland used the 33rd pick to draft Dante Cunningham.
 On June 26, 2008, Portland acquired a 2009 second-round draft pick from Denver in a three-team trade with Denver and Chicago. Portland also acquired New York's 2009 second-round draft pick and Chicago's 2010 second-round draft pick from Chicago. Previously, Chicago acquired a 2006 first-round draft pick, 2007 and 2009 second-round draft picks, an option to exchange 2007 first-round draft picks, Tim Thomas, Michael Sweetney and Jermaine Jackson on October 4, 2005, from New York in exchange for Eddy Curry and Antonio Davis. Portland used the 38th and 55th pick to draft Jon Brockman and Patrick Mills respectively.
 Portland acquired the draft rights to 31st pick Jeff Pendergraph from Sacramento in exchange for Sergio Rodríguez, the draft rights to 38th pick Jon Brockman and cash considerations.
 On June 22, 2010, Milwaukee acquired Corey Maggette and the 44th pick in the 2010 Draft from Golden State in exchange for Charlie Bell and Dan Gadzuric. Previously, Golden State acquired the 44th pick in the 2010 Draft and cash considerations on June 21, 2010, from Portland in exchange for the 34th pick in the 2010 Draft. Previously, Portland acquired 2009 and 2010 second-round picks from Chicago in a three-team trade on June 26, 2008.
 On March 15, 2012, the Portland Trail Blazers acquired Mehmet Okur, Shawne Williams and a future conditional first-round draft pick (the 6th pick) from the New Jersey Nets (now Brooklyn Nets) in exchange for Gerald Wallace.
 On March 15, 2012, the Portland Trail Blazers acquired Jonny Flynn, Hasheem Thabeet and Minnesota Timberwolves' second-round draft pick (the 40th pick) from the Houston Rockets in exchange for Marcus Camby. Previously, on June 24, 2011, the Rockets acquired Jonny Flynn, the draft rights to Donatas Motiejūnas and a future conditional second-round draft pick from the Timberwolves in exchange for Brad Miller, the draft rights to Nikola Mirotić, the draft rights to Chandler Parsons and a future conditional first-round draft pick.
 The Brooklyn Nets acquired the draft rights to 41st pick Tyshawn Taylor from the Portland Trail Blazers in exchange for cash considerations.

References
Specific

 
National Basketball Association draft
draft history